Emadabad (also Romanized as ‘Emādābād; also known as Mādowā) is a village in Rudbal Rural District, in the Central District of Marvdasht County, Fars Province, Iran. At the 2006 census, its population was 1,023, in 232 families.

References 

Populated places in Marvdasht County